Principia philosophiae cartesianae (PPC; "The Principles of Cartesian Philosophy") or Renati Descartes principia philosophiae, more geometrico demonstrata ("The Principles of René Descartes' Philosophy, Demonstrated in Geometrical Order") is a philosophical work of Baruch Spinoza published in Amsterdam in 1663. In the preface to this work, Ludovic Meyer explains that it is a reconstruction of René Descartes' Principles of Philosophy in the Euclidean or "geometric" fashion. In the appendix, a series of non-geometric prose passages entitled Metaphysical Thoughts [Cogitata Metaphisica], Spinoza explicates Descartes' views on traditional metaphysical topics (including essence, existence, idea, potential, necessity, contingency, duration, and time) while furtively interpolating some of his own.

References 

Works by Baruch Spinoza
Modern philosophical literature
Metaphysics literature
Books about René Descartes